The United States Professional Volleyball League (USPV) was a women's professional volleyball league which existed for one season in 2002.   Four teams competed, all in the midwest: the Chicago Thunder, Minnesota Chill, Grand Rapids Force, and St. Louis Quest.   The league was founded by William Kennedy.  His daughter, Kelly, would play for the Chicago team.  The Minnesota Chill beat the Chicago Thunder in a best of 5 series to become the league's only champion.

The league was planning to come back in 2003 with 4 more teams in Milwaukee, Columbus (Ohio), Dallas and Philadelphia.  Those plans were scuttled though, and a 4-team schedule was planned with the same four teams from the 2002 season. Financial backing was not forthcoming leading into the 2003 season though, and the season was cancelled.

External links
 OSC League page, with link to the season schedule
 USPV shuts down, eyes a 2004 return (archived)

Volleyball competitions in the United States
Defunct sports leagues in the United States
Sports leagues established in 2002
2002 establishments in the United States